Ulyanovsk Airport may refer to:
 Ulyanovsk Vostochny Airport, an international airport of Ulyanovsk, Russia
 Ulyanovsk Baratayevka Airport, a local airport of Ulyanovsk, Russia